A twin-fuselage aircraft has two main fuselages. It is distinct from the twin-boom configuration which has a single main fuselage with two subsidiary boom structures.

Twin fuselages have been adopted for various reasons, and a few types have entered production.

Early seaplanes
A twin-float arrangement offers stability on the water without the need for wing tip stabilising floats. Mounting the float immediately below, or integrally with, the fuselage provides a strong airframe with minimal additional weight. During and after World War I a number of such twin-fuselage floatplanes and twin-hulled flying boats were constructed, and a few entered production.

As early as 1913, the Radley-England Waterplane racing flying boat demonstrated the concept at the hands of pilot Gordon England.

The Twin Blackburn of 1915 was a long-range floatplane for anti-Zeppelin patrol. A handful of production examples were delivered but few were used operationally.

Savoia-Marchetti produced two twin-hulled flying boat types. The S.55 multirole flying boat first flew in 1924. It was built in large numbers, including both civil and military variants. The later S.66 airliner of 1931 sold less well.

The heavy bomber
During WWI, Caproni introduced one of the first production landplanes to feature twin fuselages, in the Ca.4 heavy bomber, manufacturing around 50 aircraft in a range of variants.

The heavy glider tug
During World War II the need arose for a heavy glider tug capable of towing the large Gotha Go 242 and even larger Messerschmitt Me 321 Gigant. The Heinkel He 111Z Zwilling (twin) was created by joining two He 111 fuselages with a new wing centre section and adding a fifth central engine. Although liked by its pilots when it first flew in 1941, even the 111Z could not tow a fully laden Gigant, and although a small batch became operational they saw little action.

A few variants were developed for roles such as long-range reconnaissance or air-launched anti-ship missile carrier, but none entered service.

Heavy fighters
During World War II a need arose for a heavy fighter, which could not be met by a new design proposal in a reasonable time frame. Joining two examples of an existing light fighter aircraft was one way to achieve this.

The German Messerschmitt Bf 109Z twin (Zwilling) Bf 109 prototype was destroyed in an attack by the British in 1943 before it was completed, and the project subsequently abandoned. The later Me 609 twin Me 309 project was never built.

In 1944 Dornier proposed the Dornier Do 635 long-range reconnaissance variant of the Do 335 Pfeil heavy fighter, to have twin Do 335 fuselages and four engines. It was never built.

The Italian Savoia-Marchetti SM.92 prototype was unusual in being an adaptation of a twin-boom design but did not enter production.

The North American F-82 Twin Mustang arrived too late to enter service during the War but later saw service in the Korean war.

Space launchers
More recently the idea of a dedicated re-usable large mothership, capable of carrying and launching a spacecraft, has gained interest. The twin fuselage configuration offers the advantage of a clean payload area underneath the wing centre section, without the need for exceptional ground clearance beneath the fuselages.

Early concepts included the Conroy Virtus and Twin-fuselage Lockheed C-5 Galaxy Shuttle transport aircraft of 1974.

Following the success of the Scaled Composites White Knight prototype the White Knight Two is under development, with the first example being used to flight-test the SpaceShipTwo suborbital passenger craft.

It is owned by Stratolaunch Systems, who are currently developing the air-launched spacecraft envisaged as its payload.

NASA have flown a scaled-down demonstrator of a rocket-assisted Towed glider air-launch system, in which the laden twin-fuselage mothership is towed to altitude as a glider and released. Its rocket engine then ignites, propelling it to a speed and altitude greater than those of the tow plane. The payload spacecraft is then released.

Significant one-offs
The Fouga CM.88 Gemeaux is constructed from two Fouga CM.8 gliders. It was used as an engine testbed for many years, with either a single engine mounted centrally above the wing or twin engines above each fuselage.

The Boerboon & Coller Yak-110 is an aerobatic type conceived to be eyecatchingly different. Featuring twin Yak-55 fuselages with a third, centrally-mounted jet engine, it is the only trimotor cleared for unlimited aerobatics and performs at events in the USA.

List of twin-fuselage aircraft
Types are listed in chronological order of first flight or, for those which never flew, of project announcement.

|-
| Belyayev DB-LK || USSR || Propeller || Bomber || 1940 || Prototype || 1 || 
|-
| Bestetti BN.1 || Italy || Propeller || Private || 1940 ||  ||  || Sportplane.
|-
| Blackburn T.B. || UK || Propeller || Patrol || 1915 || Production || 9 || Floatplane.
|-
| Blériot 125 || France || Propeller || Transport || 1931 || Prototype || 1 || 12 seat airliner.
|-
| Boerboon & Coller Yak-110 || USA || Mixed || Private || 2018 || Operational || 1 || Two joined Yakovlev Yak-55s. Trimotor with two tractor props and one jet engine.
|-
| Caproni Ca.4 || Italy || Propeller || Bomber and transport || 1915 || Production || 44+ || Series of types.
|-
| Conroy Virtus || USA || Propeller || Transport || 1974 || Project || 0 || Shuttle transport
|-
| DARPA General Atomics Liberty Lifter || USA || Propeller || Transport || 2022 || Project || 0 || Design proposal.
|-
| Dornier Do 635 || Germany || Propeller || Fighter || 1944 || Project || 0 || Twin Dornier Do 335 Pfeil proposal.
|-
| Twin Ercoupe || USA || Propeller ||  || 1946 ||  || 1 || Twin ERCO Ercoupe one-off conversion.
|-
| Fauvel AV.28 || France || Propeller || Fighter || 1940 || Project || 0 || Two-seater twin-engine fighter project.
|-
| Fokker K.I || Germany || Propeller ||  || 1915 || Prototype || 1 || Kampfflugzeug (twin fuselage with nacelle)
|-
| Fouga CM.88 Gemeaux || France || Jet || Experimental || 1951 || Operational || 1 || Twin Cyclope, jet engine testbed, 2 built
|-
| General Aircraft Twin Hotspur || UK || Glider || Experimental || 1942 ||  || 1 || Twin General Aircraft Hotspur
|-
| Goodhart Newbury Manflier || UK || Propeller || Experimental || 1979 || Prototype || 1 || A two-place human-powered aircraft, by Nicholas Goodhart.  138 ft wingspan, and each pilot sitting in fuselages 70 ft apart.  
|-
| Heinkel He 111Z || Germany || Propeller || Utility || 1941 || Production || 15 || Glider tug. Variant of the He 111.
|-
| KZHBV ASC || USSR || Propeller || Utility || 1935 || Prototype || 1 || Amphibious flying boat.
|-
|Labourdette-Halbronn H.T.1 || France || Propeller || Torpedo bomber || 1918 || Prototype || 1 || Flying boat. One H.T.1 (1918) flown.
|-
|Labourdette-Halbronn H.T.2 || France || Propeller || Torpedo bomber || 1919 || Prototype || 2 || Flying boat. Two H.T.2 (1919) flown.
|-
| Twin fuselage Lockheed C-5 Galaxy || USA || Jet || Transport || 1974 || Project || 0 || Shuttle transport aircraft proposal.
|-
| Messerschmitt Bf 109Z || Germany || Propeller || Fighter || 1943 || Project || 0 || Twin Bf 109 prototype. Destroyed while under construction.
|-
| Messerschmitt Me 609 || Germany || Propeller || Fighter || 1941 || Project || 0 || Twin Me 309 proposal.
|-
| North American F-82 Twin Mustang || USA || Propeller || Fighter || 1945 || Production || 272 || Long-range.
|-
| Pipistrel Taurus G4 || Slovenia || Propeller || Experimental || 2011 || Prototype || 1 || Electric aircraft.  Winner of the 2011 Green Flight Challenge.
|-
| Radley-England Waterplane || UK || Propeller || Racing Aircraft || 1913 || Prototype || 1 || Damaged, rebuilt in modified form as Waterplane 2.
|- 
| Ricci R.1 || Italy || Propeller ||  || 1917 || Prototype ||  || Flying-boat
|-
| Savoia-Marchetti S.55 || Italy || Propeller || Multirole || 1924 || Production || 243+ || Flying boat.
|-
| Savoia-Marchetti S.66 || Italy || Propeller || Transport || 1931 || Production || 24 || Flying boat.
|-
| Savoia-Marchetti SM.92 || Italy || Propeller || Fighter  || 1943 || Prototype || 1 || 
|-
| Scaled Composites Model 348 White Knight Two || USA || Jet || Spacecraft launcher || 2008 || Prototype || 1 || 
|-
| Scaled Composites Model 351 Roc || USA || Jet || Spacecraft launcher || 2019 || Prototype || 1 || Launcher for Stratolaunch spacecraft.
|-
| Scaled Composites Model 367 BiPod || USA || Propeller || Experimental || 2011 || Prototype || 1 || Flying car, carried out "hops" under wheeled power.
|-
| SSAKTB SL-2P || Lithuania || Glider || Experimental || 1987 || Prototype || 1 || Flying laboratory, made from two LET L-13 Blaník gliders.
|-
| Thomas-Morse MB-4 || USA || Propeller || Utility || 1920 || Prototype || 2+ || Mail plane
|-
| Towed glider air-launch system || USA ||  || Spacecraft launcher || 2013 || Project || 0 || NASA Dryden
|-
| Tupolev ANT-22 || USSR || Propeller ||  || 1934 || Prototype ||  1 || Flying boat.
|-
| Voisin Type O || France || Propeller ||  || 1914 || Prototype || 1 || Made by merging two Voisin Type M aircraft.
|-
| Wagner Twin Cub || USA || Propeller ||  || 1952 || Prototype || 1 || Twin Piper Cub one-off conversion.
|-
| Wight Twin Seaplane || UK || Propeller ||  || 1916 || Prototype ||   4 || Variant of the Wight Twin Landplane of twin boom configuration.
|}

References

Notes

Bibliography
 Gunston, Bill, The Cambridge Aerospace Dictionary, Cambridge, Cambridge University Press 2004, /

See also
 Asymmetrical aircraft
 Composite aircraft

 
Aircraft configurations
Lists of aircraft by design configuration